International Steels Limited is a Pakistani company which manufactures steel products. It is based in Karachi, Pakistan.

It was founded in 2007. Its plant is located at Landhi and produces cold rolled steel sheets.

References

Steel companies of Pakistan
Manufacturing companies established in 2007
Manufacturing companies based in Karachi
Companies listed on the Pakistan Stock Exchange
Pakistani companies established in 2007